Diamond Harbour Football Club is an Indian professional football club based in Diamond Harbour, West Bengal. It currently competes in CFL 1st Division which is the third tier football league in the state of West Bengal.

History
TMC politician and Diamond Harbour MP Abhishek Banerjee launched the DHFC in 2022. The IFA allowed DHFC to participate in CFL First Division, third tier of Calcutta Football League. The club then appointed former Mohun Bagan and Kerala Blasters head coach Kibu Vicuña for the upcoming league season. In December 2022, Vicuña left the club and taking charge of another city-based club Mohammedan Sporting.

Technical staff

Players

Achievements

See also
Football in India
History of Indian football
Indian football league system
List of football clubs in Kolkata
List of football clubs in West Bengal
State football leagues in India

References

Association football clubs established in 2022
Football clubs in Kolkata
2022 establishments in India